The United States Armys enlisted rank insignia that was used during World War I differs from the current system. The color scheme used for the insignia's chevron was olive drab for field use uniforms or one of several colors depending on the corps on dress uniforms. The chevron system used by enlisted men during World War I came into being on July 17, 1902, and was changed to a different system in 1919. Specification 760, which was dated May 31, 1905, contained 45 different enlisted insignia that varied designs and titles by different corps of the Army. General Order Number 169, which was enacted on August 14, 1907, created an even larger variety of enlisted rank insignia. Pay grades similar to the current system were not yet in use by the U.S. Army, and instead, the pay system reflected the job assignment of the soldier rather than their rank. By the end of World War I, the system contained 128 different insignia designs.

Field service rank insignia

Other rank insignia
The ranks used by the army during the war (1917-1918), by branch, were:

Cavalry

Infantry

Coast Artillery Corps

Field Artillery

Signal Corps

Aviator (until creation of the Air Service)
Master Signal Electrician
Sergeant First Class
Chauffeur First Class
Sergeant
Chauffeur
Corporal
Cook
Horseshoer
Private serving as Lance Corporal
Assistant Chauffeur
Private First Class
Private

Corps of Engineers

Regimental Sergeant Major
Master Engineer Senior Grade
Band Leader
Master Engineer Junior Grade
Supply Sergeant, regimental
Battalion Sergeant Major
Supply Sergeant, Battalion
First Sergeant
Sergeant First Class
Assistant Band Leader
Sergeant Bugler
Color Sergeant
Sergeant
Supply Sergeant
Mess Sergeant
Stable Sergeant
Band Sergeant
Corporal
Corporal Bugler (created on July 9, 1918)
Band Corporal
Cook
Horseshoer
Saddler
Wagoner
Bugler First Class (created on July 9, 1918)
Bugler
Private serving as Lance Corporal
Private First Class
Private

Medical Department

Master Hospital Sergeant
Hospital Sergeant
Sergeant First Class
Sergeant
Corporal
Cook
Farrier
Horseshoer
Saddler
Mechanic
Private serving as Lance Corporal
Private First Class
Private

Ordnance Department
Ordnance Sergeant
Sergeant
Corporal
Private serving as Lance Corporal
Private First Class
Private Second Class

Quartermaster Corps

Quartermaster Sergeant, Senior Grade
Quartermaster Sergeant, Quartermaster Corps
Sergeant First Class
Sergeant
Corporal
Cook
Private serving as Lance Corporal
Private First Class
Private

Air Service (Created May 24, 1918)

Aviator
Master signal Electrician
Sergeant First Class
Chauffeur First Class
Sergeant
Chauffeur
Corporal
Cook
Horseshoer
Private serving as Lance Corporal
Assistant Chauffeur
Private First Class
Private

Chemical Warfare Service (Created June 28, 1918)
Master Chemical Sergeant
Sergeant First Class
Sergeant
Corporal
Private serving as Lance Corporal
Private First Class
Private

Tank Corps (Created in late 1917)

Regimental Sergeant Major
Master Engineer Senior Grade
Supply Sergeant, regimental
Battalion Sergeant Major
Supply Sergeant, Battalion
First Sergeant
Sergeant First Class
Sergeant Bugler
Color Sergeant
Sergeant
Supply Sergeant
Mess Sergeant
Corporal
Corporal Bugler (created on July 9, 1918)
Cook
Bugler First Class (created on July 9, 1918)
Bugler
Private serving as Lance Corporal
Private First Class
Private

Motor Transport Corps (Created August 15, 1918)
Quartermaster Sergeant, Senior Grade
Quartermaster Sergeant, Quartermaster Corps
Sergeant First Class
Sergeant
Corporal
Private serving as Lance Corporal
Private First Class
Private

U.S. Military Academy Detachment
First Sergeant
Band sergeant and Assistant leader
Sergeant
Sergeant of Field Music
Corporal
Cook
Bugler First Class (created on July 9, 1918)
Bugler
Private serving as Lance Corporal

Service School Detachments

Regimental Sergeant Major
Sergeant Major Senior Grade
Master Electrician
Master signal Electrician
Engineer
Quartermaster Sergeant, Quartermaster Corps
Supply Sergeant, regimental
Battalion Sergeant Major
Sergeant Major Junior Grade
First Sergeant
Sergeant First Class
Electrician Sergeant First Class
Master Gunner
Electrician Sergeant Second Class
Sergeant
Supply Sergeant
Stable Sergeant
Fireman
Corporal
Corporal Bugler (created on July 9, 1918)
Cook
Horseshoer
Saddler
Wagoner
Chief Mechanic
Mechanic
Bugler First Class (created on July 9, 1918)
Bugler
Private serving as Lance Corporal
Private First Class
Private

Article III, paragraph 9 of the Regulations for Army of the United States 1913, Corrected to April 15, 1917, gives the order of precedence for officers and noncommissioned officers as:
1. Lieutenant General
2. Major General
3. Brigadier General
4. Colonel
5. Lieutenant Colonel
6. Major
7. Captain
8. First Lieutenant
9. Second Lieutenant
10. Aviator, Signal Corps
11. Cadet
12. (a)  Sergeant Major, Regimental
 Sergeant Major, Senior Grade, Coast Artillery Corps
12.(b)  Quartermaster Sergeant, Senior Grade, Quartermaster Corps
Master Hospital Sergeant, Medical Department
Master Engineer Senior Grade, Corps of Engineers
Master Electrician, Coast Artillery Corps
Master Signal Electrician
Band Leader
12.(c)   Hospital Sergeant, Medical Department
	Master Engineer Junior Grade, Corps of Engineers
	Engineer, Coast Artillery Corps
13.Ordnance Sergeant
	Quartermaster Sergeant, Quartermaster Corps
	Supply Sergeant Regimental
14.	Sergeant Major, Squadron and Battalion
	Sergeant Major Junior Grade, Coast Artillery Corps	
Supply Sergeant, Battalion, Corps of Engineers
15.(a)	First Sergeant
15.(b)	Sergeant First Class, Medical Department
	Sergeant First Class, Quartermaster Corps
	Sergeant First Class, Corps of Engineers
	Sergeant First Class, Signal Corps
	Electrician Sergeant First Class, Coast Artillery Corps
	Electrician Sergeant, Artillery Detachment, United States Military Academy
	Assistant Engineer, Coast Artillery Corps
	Master Gunner, Coast Artillery Corps
	Master Gunner, Artillery Detachment, United States Military Academy
	Band Sergeant and Assistant Leader, United States Military Academy Band
	Assistant Band Leader
	Sergeant Bugler
	Electrician Sergeant Second Class, Coast Artillery Corps
	Electrician Sergeant Second Class, Artillery Detachment, United States Military Academy
	Radio Sergeant
16.Color Sergeant
17.Sergeant
	Supply Sergeant Company
	Mess Sergeant
	Stable Sergeant
	Fireman, Coast Artillery Corps
18.	Corporal

See also
Comparative officer ranks of World War II
United States Army enlisted rank insignia
United States Army enlisted rank insignia of World War II
United States Army officer rank insignia
United States Army uniforms in World War II

References

External links
Roots Web World War I Army Rank Insignia Identification
Roots Web World War I Uniforms 
Military Historians-Chevrons
U.S. Army Institute of Heraldry-History of Enlisted Ranks
 

United States Army rank insignia
United States in World War I